3 Ring Circus is a 1954 American comedy film directed by Joseph Pevney and starring Dean Martin and Jerry Lewis.  The picture was shot from February 17 to March 31, 1954, and released on December 25 by Paramount Pictures. The supporting cast includes Joanne Dru, Zsa Zsa Gabor, Wallace Ford, Sig Ruman, Nick Cravat, and Elsa Lanchester.

Plot
Pete Nelson, a smooth operator who has just been discharged from the Army, joins forces with his old buddy, the loud Jerome X. Hotchkiss, and together they join a circus. The Clyde Brent Circus, to be exact. Jerry has taken a job as apprentice lion tamer. He is set on being a circus clown, but his plans are squandered when they meet the circus manager Sam Morley and owner Jill Brent, who is also ringmaster. The circus has financial problems, so the only way that both Pete and Jerry can be hired if they help out wherever needed.

Jerry dutifully reports to the designated lion tamer, Colonel Schlitz, but is terrified when Schlitz forces him into the lions' cage with only a whip and chair for protection. Schlitz keeps calling at him to behave coolly and to show no fear, but all Jerry can do is to nervously try to befriend the beasts. Schlitz pulls him out of the cage.

Later in the day Jerry and Pete are washing the elephants when Jill stops by to chat. Pete starts flirting, which she finds both attractive and annoying. Jerry sneaks into Puffo the Wonder Clown's tent and tries on his hats. Morley catches him red-handed and scolds him.

One night while working in a custard stand. Pete and Jerry are overwhelmed by the crowd and lose control of the machine. Morley sends Jerry to help Puffo dress for his performance. The arrogant clown rejects Jerry's help. Jerry's next assignment is to hand Nero, the tightrope walker, a unicycle. The audience roars with laughter at Jerry's fumbling attempts to climb a rope ladder while holding the bike. When Jerry accidentally ends up riding the unicycle on the tightrope, the crowd hushes. Pete and the clowns rush in with a net and catch him when he falls.

Saadia, the Queen of the Trapeze, is up to perform. She goes into the ring and Pete is indeed breath-taken by her great beauty. Jill, however, dislikes the egotistical, greedy Saadia. Morley insists the circus would go bankrupt without her. To Jill's disgust, Pete agrees to become Saadia's personal assistant.

Morley then talks Jerry into becoming a human cannonball. Pete, wearing nothing on his upper body, shows off for Saadia, giving her a private demonstration of his skills on the parallel bars. Saadia is attracted to Pete, and they end up kissing. They are interrupted by the slightly jealous Jill, who informs Saadia that, for financial reasons, there will be an extra show on Saturday.

Saadia is well aware that the survival of the circus depends on her, but she refuses to do the extra show. Pete, watching her perform to a capacity crowd, gets an idea of how to save the circus.

Morley finally allows Jerry to go into the ring in place of a sick clown. Jerry is ecstatic, but one performer unhappy with Jerry's big break is Puffo. He resents the cheap laughs that Jerry gets from the audience and starts bullying him in the ring. The audience is upset and starts to boo Puffo, wanting him to go off. After the show, Jerry tells Puffo that he is not angry with him.

Pete flirts with a very receptive Jill, but when he asks about the circus's profits, she is furious and slaps him. Soon after, in Saadia's tent, Pete explains to Jill his plan to increase his profits with gambling. A skeptical Jill, who inherited the circus from her father, allows Pete to set up some gaming tables on the midway.

The circus continues its tour. On Jill's birthday, Pete and Jerry throw her a big party. Puffo gets quite drunk and interrupts the festivities to declare he is quitting. He will consider staying on if Jerry and Pete are fired. Pete gets angry and punches Puffo in frustration. Jill later fires Puffo from the circus and replaces his act with Jerry.

Jerry starts performing under the name Jerricho. He is an instant hit with the audience, even bigger than Saadia, who gets jealous. So jealous she too threatens to quit unless the circus gets rid of Jerry. Tired of her ego, Pete tells her "drive carefully" and sends her on her way. Jill is quite relieved that the alluring Saadia is out of her way.

However, her relief is short-lived. She witnesses a fight between Pete's shell-game operator and a customer then demands that Pete stop the gambling operation. Pete refuses and announces he is leaving the circus, too. Sure that the loyal Jerry will go with him, Jill insists on leaving instead, preferring to leave the circus to Pete than lose it entirely.

Jerry verbally attacks Pete for canceling a benefit performance for disadvantaged children. Pete then tells Jerry he "ain't nice" anymore, and quits. Jerry and the other clowns decide to perform the show anyway, and Jill meets them at the outdoor arena.

Jerry's words ring in Pete's head while Jerry performs and delights the children with his clowning. Jerry goes to great lengths to get a sad-faced handicapped girl to laugh. A car arrives in the ring out of it comes Pete, dressed in a clown suit. Jerry and Jill are delighted to see Pete join in the fun.

Cast
Dean Martin as Peter "Pete" Nelson
Jerry Lewis as Jerome F. "Jerry" Hotchkiss
Joanne Dru	 as Jill Brent
Zsa Zsa Gabor as Saadia
Wallace Ford as Sam Morley
Sig Ruman as Colonel Fritz Schlitz, Lion Tamer
Gene Sheldon as Puffo the Clown
Nick Cravat as Timmy
Elsa Lanchester as The Bearded Lady
Jimmy the raven

Production
The film was the first starring Martin and Lewis to be shot in VistaVision. A clip from it was shown in a promotional short film, Paramount Presents VistaVision.

An edited version removing the early military and circus scenes of Martin and Lewis together, plus Martin's later music numbers, was released by Paramount in 1974 and shown at children's matinees. As the new title Jerrico The Wonder Clown implied, the resulting edit lessened Martin's screen time and threw the emphasis on Lewis' character even more than in the original film.

Home media
For unknown reasons, 3 Ring Circus was the only Martin and Lewis film without a home video release until August 2021 when it was released digitally on iTunes, Amazon Prime Video and Vudu.

References

External links 

1954 films
1950s buddy comedy films
American buddy comedy films
Circus films
1950s English-language films
Films directed by Joseph Pevney
Films produced by Hal B. Wallis
Films scored by Walter Scharf
Paramount Pictures films
1954 comedy films
1950s American films